A swashplate is a mechanical device that translates input via the helicopter flight controls into motion of the main rotor blades.  Because the main rotor blades are spinning, the swashplate is used to transmit three of the pilot's commands from the non-rotating fuselage to the rotating rotor hub and mainblades.

Assembly
The swashplate consists of two main parts: a stationary swashplate and a rotating swashplate.  The stationary (outer) swashplate is mounted on the main rotor mast and is connected to the cyclic and collective controls by a series of pushrods.  It is able to tilt in all directions and move vertically.  The rotating (inner) swashplate is mounted to the stationary swashplate by means of a bearing and is allowed to rotate with the main rotor mast.  An anti-rotation link prevents the inner swash from rotating independently of the blades, which would apply torque to the actuators.  The outer swashplate typically has an anti-rotation slider as well to prevent it from rotating.  Both swashplates tilt up and down as one unit.  The rotating swashplate is connected to the pitch horns by the pitch links. Alternative mechanics to the stationary (outer) swashplate are the hexapod and the universal joint.
Swashplates for helicopters having two rotors mounted on the same shaft are much more complex than the single rotor helicopters.

Cyclic blade control
Cyclic controls are used to change a helicopter's roll and pitch.  Push rods or hydraulic actuators tilt the outer swashplate in response to the pilot's commands.  The swashplate moves in the intuitively expected direction, tilting forwards to respond to a forward input, for instance. However "pitch links" on the blades transmit the pitch information way ahead of the blade's actual position, giving the blades time to "fly up" or "fly down" to reach the desired position. That is, to tilt the helicopter forward, the difference of lift around the blades should be maximum along the left-right plane, creating a torque that, due to the gyroscopic effect, will tilt the rotor disc forward and not sideways.

Collective blade control
To control the collective pitch of the main rotor blades, the entire swashplate must be moved up or down along its axis without changing the orientation of the cyclic controls.  Conventionally, each control mechanism, (roll, pitch, and collective) had an individual actuator responsible for the movement. In the case of pitch, the entire swashplate is moved along the mainshaft by a one actuator. However, some newer model helicopters remove this mechanically complex separation of functionalities by using three interdependent actuators that can each move the entire swashplate.  This is called cyclic/collective pitch mixing (CCPM). The benefit of CCPM is that smaller actuators can work together to move the swashplate across its full range of control, meaning the actuators can be smaller and lighter.

Animations

History

The swashplate was originally proposed by Russian Boris Yuryev in 1911, though he did not use it on his first helicopter of 1912.

Pescara helicopters (1919–30) are coaxial rotors helicopters, each rotor being controlled by a swashplate (oscillating bearing) driven by the first control stick for helicopter (UK 178,452 Improvement in or relating to Joy Sticks for helicopters. Convention date in Spain: April 12, 1921).

French engineer and helicopter precursor Etienne Oehmichen filed an application to patent a swashplate device on June 18, 1926, in France and later in the U.S. (August 12, 1929).

Today, on most modern aircraft the swashplate is above the transmission and the pushrods are visible outside the fuselage, but a few early designs, notably light helicopters built by Enstrom Helicopter, placed it underneath the transmission and enclosed the rotating pushrods inside the mainshaft.  This reduces rotor hub drag since there are no exposed linkages.

Other swashplate and control design have been used.  For instance, Kaman Aircraft helicopters do not use a traditional swashplate and instead operate servo flaps on the rotor blades to adjust the angle of attack of the blades.

References

Helicopter components